Captain William H. Ward (December 9, 1840 – April 11, 1927), American officer of the United States Army. He received the Medal of Honor for heroism at Vicksburg, Mississippi, May 3, 1863.

William Ward is buried at Highland Park Cemetery in Kansas City, Kansas.

Medal of Honor citation
Rank and organization: Captain, Company B, 47th Ohio Infantry. Place and date: At Vicksburg, Miss., May 3, 1863. Entered service at: Adrian, Mich. Born: December 9, 1840, Adrian, Mich. Date of issue: January 2, 1895.

Citation:

Voluntarily commanded the expedition which, under cover of darkness, attempted to run the enemy's batteries.

See also
List of Medal of Honor recipients
List of American Civil War Medal of Honor recipients: T–Z

References

1840 births
1927 deaths
United States Army Medal of Honor recipients
United States Army officers
People from Adrian, Michigan
American Civil War recipients of the Medal of Honor
Military personnel from Michigan